Claude Taylor is the name of:
Claude Taylor (transportation executive) (1925–2015), Canadian transportation executive
Claude Taylor (rower) (1880–?), English rower
Claude D. Taylor (1911–1970), real estate agent and political figure in New Brunswick
Claude Taylor (cricketer) (1904–1966), English cricketer
Claude A. Taylor (1902–1966), Chief Justice of the South Carolina Supreme Court

See also
Claude D. Taylor School